Skylar Christan "Skye" Townsend (born September 1, 1993) is an American actress and singer. She has released two EPs, Vomit (2012) and Rocking Chairs (2015). Townsend joined the main cast of A Black Lady Sketch Show in 2021.

Music career

2012: Recording and releasing Vomit EP
Townsend released her debut EP album Vomit  online via Digital Download on May 5, 2012. The EP featured collaborations from artist like Karina Pasian & Chris O'Bannon" on ("Go Fish!"), "Micky Munday" on ("Hazel") and Wyann Vaughn on ("Free") inspired by Deniece Williams's 1976 hit "Free". The majority of Vomit was produced by Jonathan "JMBeatz" Malone, Waren Vaughn, Vybe, Rey Reel and more. Later on, videos were directed by her father Robert Townsend, for "Go Fish" and "It's Normal" during the month of June 2012.

2015: Recording and releasing Rocking Chairs EP 
In mid to late 2014, Townsend began constructing her second studio EP album, titled Rocking Chairs. The project included 5 tracks along with a feature from rapper, "DEVEY2G" on a song, titled "Always".

Acting
Townsend made her acting debut on BET web series 8 Days a Week, portraying the character "Jade Taylor". The show ended after 10 episodes. Skye completed a film titled Playin' for Love in 2013, playing the character Maya Hardaway the lead cheerleader. She guest starred in the popular TV series Lucifer as Axara. She has also been cast as Lola in the feature film Chase, shot in summer 2018. As of 2021, Townsend is starring in A Black Lady Sketch Show. She also appeared in on an episode of the 2021 iCarly revival series, which also features her A Black Lady Sketch Show co-star Laci Mosley.

Personal life 
She is the daughter of actor, director, and comedian, Robert Townsend.

Discography

Extended Play

Notable songs
2012: "Go Fish!" (Produced by JM)
2012: "Its Normal" (Produced by JM)
2013: "Noreg" (Produced by IrateGenius & KayJayBeatz)
2013: "X-Talk" (Produced by Augie Ray)
2013: "Pineapple Diet (ft. Micky Munday)" (Produced by Drupiano)
2015: "Rocking Chairs" (produced by JM)
2015: "Always (ft. DEVEY2G)" (produced by JM)

References

External links

1993 births
American child actresses
American child singers
Child pop musicians
Living people
Musicians from Santa Monica, California
Singers from California
Actresses from Santa Monica, California
African-American actresses
21st-century African-American women singers